Houston is a city in Houston County, Minnesota, United States. The population was 997 at the 2020 census.

History
The community was named after Sam Houston, first president of the Republic of Texas.

In 1852, William McSpadden platted the original site of the Village of Houston. McSpadden had served under Sam Houston in the Mexican–American War. Pioneers followed him into the area and by 1854 there were stores and a school among the approximately 40 buildings in the settlement.

Houston was incorporated in 1874.

Geography

Demographics

2010 census
As of the census of 2010, there were 979 people, 418 households, and 239 families living in the city. The racial makeup of the city was 99.5% White, 0.4% Native American, and 0.1% from two or more races. Hispanic or Latino of any race were 0.1% of the population.

There were 418 households, of which 29.2% had children under the age of 18 living with them, 43.1% were married couples living together, 10.8% had a female householder with no husband present, 3.3% had a male householder with no wife present, and 42.8% were non-families. 39.0% of all households were made up of individuals, and 18.1% had someone living alone who was 65 years of age or older. The average household size was 2.23 and the average family size was 2.98.

The median age in the city was 38.8 years. 25.5% of residents were under the age of 18; 6.5% were between the ages of 18 and 24; 24.8% were from 25 to 44; 20% were from 45 to 64; and 23.2% were 65 years of age or older. The gender makeup of the city was 46.1% male and 53.9% female.

2000 census
As of the census of 2000, there were 1,020 people, 434 households, and 255 families living in the city. The racial makeup of the city was 99.02% White, 0.49% African American, 0.29% Native American, 0.10% from other races, and 0.10% from two or more races. Hispanic or Latino of any race were 0.20% of the population.

There were 434 households, out of which 27.0% had children under the age of 18 living with them, 45.6% were married couples living together, 11.3% had a female householder with no husband present, and 41.2% were non-families. 37.8% of all households were made up of individuals, and 23.0% had someone living alone who was 65 years of age or older.  The average household size was 2.19 and the average family size was 2.85.

In the city, the population was spread out, with 22.7% under the age of 18, 6.4% from 18 to 24, 22.4% from 25 to 44, 19.8% from 45 to 64, and 28.7% who were 65 years of age or older.  The median age was 44 years. For every 100 females, there were 81.5 males.  For every 100 females age 18 and over, there were 75.1 males.

The median income for a household in the city was $29,236, and the median income for a family was $38,462. Males had a median income of $31,161 versus $21,691 for females. The per capita income for the city was $17,087.  About 8.2% of families and 10.3% of the population were below the poverty line, including 10.8% of those under age 18 and 16.9% of those age 65 or over.

Arts and culture

Annual cultural events
"Houston Hoedown Days" is the last full weekend in July. The event includes tractor pulls, the Minnesota State Horsepull, dances and flea markets.

The "International Festival of Owls" is held each year in Houston, and is the only full-weekend, all-owl event in North America.

Parks and recreation
Houston is the eastern terminus of the Root River segment of the Blufflands State Trail.

Sports
In November 2008 the Houston Hurricanes won the Minnesota 9-Man Football State Championship. They ended their season with a 14–0 mark. This was the first state championship in school history, with the exception of five state appearances by the girls track team, which included a state title in 2006.

Five seniors from the 2008 state championship football team went on to play college football—three at UW-La Crosse and two at Luther College.

Education
Houston Public Schools serves Houston.  With the program K12 Inc., Houston Public Schools has developed the Minnesota Center for Online Learning and the Minnesota Virtual Academy.  Open to students statewide, these programs are unique in that there are no others of their kind in Minnesota.

U.S. News & World Report named Houston High School of Houston, Minnesota one of America's "Top 100 Schools" in a study published December 8, 2008 entitled “America’s Best High Schools.” https://www.usnews.com/directories/high-schools/ .

Houston Public Schools was also ranked #6 in the state of Minnesota by the U.S. News & World Report

Infrastructure

Transportation
Minnesota State Highways 16 and 76 are two of the main routes in the city.

Notable people
Everett Bidwell, Wisconsin legislator, served as a member of the Wisconsin State Assembly and Wisconsin Senate; born in Houston.
John Q. Briggs, Minnesota legislator and businessman, lived in Houston, MN.
Francis Martin Kelly, third Bishop of the Roman Catholic Diocese of Winona; born in Houston.
Jeanne Poppe, Minnesota legislator and former member of the Minnesota House of Representatives; born in Houston.
John J. Sliter, Minnesota legislator, served as a member of the Minnesota House of Representatives, was a member of the Houston School Board.

2007 flood

See also
Houston Public Library (Minnesota)

References

External links
 
 City of Houston Minnesota  Website
 Houston Minnesota Chamber of Commerce
 City-Data.com

Cities in Minnesota
Cities in Houston County, Minnesota